The Sailor's Revenge is the eighth solo album by Bap Kennedy. The album was produced by Mark Knopfler. All eleven songs were written by Bap Kennedy.

Track listing
All tracks composed by Bap Kennedy
 "Shimnavale" – 5:06
 "Not a Day Goes By" – 4:05
 "Jimmy Sanchez" – 4:38
 "Lonely No More" – 3:06
 "The Right Stuff" – 3:46
 "Maybe I Will" – 4:33
 "Please Return to Jesus" – 4:11
 "Sailor's Revenge" – 4:53
 "Working Man" – 4:30
 "The Beauty of You" – 3:30
 "Celtic Sea" – 6:09

Reception
In his review in The Telegraph, Martin Chilton wrote:

Deluxe edition
A deluxe two-CD edition was released 7 February 2012 and includes a bonus 11 track "best of" disc that features two previously unreleased tracks.
 "Moonlight Kiss"  
 "Unforgiven"
 "On the Mighty Ocean Alcohol"
 "Milky Way"
 "Loverman"
 "The Way I Love Her"
 "Howl On"
 "The Sweet Smell of Success"
 "Into the Arms of Love"
 "Be True to Your Heart"
 "Moriarty's Blues"

References

External links
 Official website

2012 albums
Bap Kennedy albums
Albums produced by Mark Knopfler